The men's sprint at the 2012 UCI Track Cycling World Championships was held on 6–7 April. 53 cyclists participated in the contest.

Medalists

Results

Qualifying
The qualifying was held at 13:00.

Finals

1/16 finals 
The 1/16 finals were held at 14:25.

1/8 finals 
The 1/8 finals were held at 16:15.

Repechage 
The 1/8 finals repechages were held at 17:10.

Quarterfinals 
The quarterfinals were held at 19:10, 20:20 and 21:25.

Race 5th–8th place 
The race for 5th–8th place was held at 21:30.

Semifinals 
The semifinals were held at 19:00 and 19:40.

Small final 
The finals were held at 21:10 and 22:20.

Final

References

2012 UCI Track Cycling World Championships
UCI Track Cycling World Championships – Men's sprint